The 1991 Paris Open was a men's tennis tournament played on indoor carpet courts. It was the 19th edition of the Paris Masters, and was part of the ATP Super 9 of the 1991 ATP Tour. It took place at the Palais omnisports de Paris-Bercy in Paris, France, from 28 October through 4 November 1991.

The singles draw was headlined by ATP No. 1, Tokyo, Queen's, US Open titleist, Australian Open, Wimbledon semi-finalist Stefan Edberg, Australian Open, Stockholm winner, Wimbledon, Monte Carlo, Indianapolis runner-up Boris Becker and Indian Wells, Miami and French Open champion Jim Courier. Other top seeds were Cincinnati winner Guy Forget, Pete Sampras, Sergi Bruguera and Karel Nováček.

Finals

Singles

 Guy Forget defeated  Pete Sampras, 7–6(11–9), 4–6, 5–7, 6–4, 6–4
It was Guy Forget's 6th title of the year and his 9th overall. It was his 2nd Masters title of the year, and overall.

Doubles

 John Fitzgerald /  Anders Järryd defeated  Kelly Jones /  Rick Leach, 3–6, 6–3, 6–2

References

External links
 ATP tournament profile
 Official website